The 2012–13 Drexel Dragons men's basketball team represented Drexel University during the 2012–13 NCAA Division I men's basketball season. The Dragons, led by 12th year head coach Bruiser Flint, played their home games at Daskalakis Athletic Center and were members of the Colonial Athletic Association. They finished the season 13–18, 9–9 in CAA play to finish in seventh place. They lost in the quarterfinals of the CAA tournament to George Mason.

Roster

Schedule

|-
!colspan=9 style=| Regular Season

|-
!colspan=9 style=| CAA tournament

Rankings

Awards
Damion Lee
CAA All-Conference Second Team
CAA Player of the Week (2)

Frantz Massenat
CAA All-Conference Second Team

References

Drexel Dragons men's basketball seasons
Drexel
Drexel
Drexel